The Simpson County School District is a public school district based in Mendenhall, Mississippi, USA. The district's boundaries parallel those of Simpson County.

Schools
Magee High School
Mendenhall High School
Magee Middle School
Mendenhall Junior High School
Magee Elementary School
Mendenhall Elementary School
Simpson Central School

In 2022 the district plans to consolidate the two high schools into a single school. The two were previously athletic rivals. Mac Gordon, a former newspaper employee from McComb, Mississippi who wrote an editorial for The Clarion Ledger, described the consolidation as "stunning news" considering that it involves two high schools with "sound" performance in academic parameters, in "progressive communities with much pride" in these institutions. The consolidated facility will be known as Simpson County High School. In February 2022 the district proposed a bond for $39 million for the new high school; if passed, the art and sports facilities would open at the same time the new high school opens. Voters rejected the bond.

Demographics

2006-07 school year
There were a total of 4,292 students enrolled in the Simpson County School District during the 2006–2007 school year. The gender makeup of the district was 48% female and 52% male. The racial makeup of the district was 52.40% African American, 46.44% White, 0.89% Hispanic, 0.16% Native American, and 0.12% Asian. 67.1% of the district's students were eligible to receive free lunch.

Previous school years

Accountability statistics

See also
List of school districts in Mississippi

References

Further reading
 https://www.simpsoncounty.ms:443/local-news/school-district-proceeding-consolidation
 https://www.simpsoncounty.ms/front-page-slideshow-news/consolidated-high-school-proposal-be-presented#sthash.AQVxGgdq.dpbs

External links
 

Education in Simpson County, Mississippi
School districts in Mississippi
School districts in the Jackson metropolitan area, Mississippi